Shama Zaidi (born 25 September 1938) is an Indian screenplay writer, costume designer, art director, theatre person, art critic, and documentary film maker. She is married to director M. S. Sathyu. Shama Zaidi Was Honored with Lifetime Achievement Award at ICA - International Cultural Artifact Film Festival in 2021.

Background
Shama Zaidi is the daughter of Bashir Hussain Zaidi, a politician and educationist, and his wife Qudsia Zaidi. Her mother Qudsia was an associate of Habib Tanvir, the communist ideologue and theatre personality. Shama was the only daughter of the couple and she has two brothers. Both her parents were closely associated with the "progressive" communist movement in India, and Shama grew up in a strongly left-wing environment. She was educated at Woodstock School, Mussoorie, and then at Miranda House, New Delhi. She has a bachelor's degree in English from Delhi University, and a diploma in stage design from the Slade School of Art, London. She is praised for her excellent screen writing in T.V serial "Bharat Ek Khoj" .

Career

Journalism
 Art critic for The Statesman, The Patriot and Shankar's Weekly, New Delhi.
 Written numerous articles on film, theatre, and television for Cinema Vision,  Cinema in India, etc., and other journals and newspapers.

Theatre
Zaidi became interested in costume design while in school at Woodstock, Mussoorie, which had extensive theatre activities. Also due to the influence of her mother Qudsia Zaidi, who started the Hindustani Theatre in the late 1950s with Habib Tanvir and other friends. In her college days at Miranda House she started helping out with the stage productions there, apart from taking an active interest in Hindustani Theatre.

After her B.A., Shama went to Slade School of Art, London, for a one-year course in stage and costume design. She then worked in Germany at the Frankfurt Municipal Theatre as an apprentice and for some time as an observer in the Berliner Ensemble. (Apprentice in stage, film and TV design to Herr Hein Heckroth, Frankfurt am Main, West Germany. Herr Heckroth was the designer of Red Shoes Hoffman's Tales, etc.)

She returned to Delhi in 1961 and designed costumes for Hindustani Theatre before shifting to Bombay in 1965 where she worked as Writer, Designer, Performer and Director for Indian People's Theatre Association (IPTA), Mumbai. Since 1980 she has designed more for films and television than theatre.

She worked as a writer, director, costume designer or art director for the following stage productions –

Stage productions
 Chou En-lai, a historical costume pageant at Lodi Gardens, New Delhi

Hindustani Theatre
 Shakuntala (1958) – Costume Design
 Mitti ki Gaadi (1958)- Costume Design & Artiste
 Khalid Ki Khala (1958)- Costume Design & Artiste
 Mudrarakshas (1962) – Direction & Costume Design
 Sufaid Kundali (1963) – Costume Design & Artiste
 Mera Naam Trufaldeen (1964)- Adaptation & Costume Design

Indian People's Theatre Association, Mumbai

She had been associated with the IPTA's Inter collegiate Drama Competition since 1972 as a jury member.

 Translated/adapted over a dozen plays into Hindustani from various languages.

Cinema
She has written scripts/dialogues for documentaries and feature films with Satyajit Ray, Shyam Benegal, M. S. Sathyu and others. She has also worked as Costume Designer and Art Director.

Filmography
 Charandas Chor (1975) (The Thief Charandas)
Direction Shyam Benegal; Screenplay Shama Zaidi
Based on Habib Tanvir's retelling of a famous Rajasthani folk tale. Songs were by Habib Tanvir and most of the dialogues were improvised by the folk artistes.

 Garm Hava (Hot Winds) 1974 / Colour / 136min / Urdu Direction M S Sathyu; Screenplay Shama Zaidi & Kaifi Azmi; Costume Design Shama Zaidi
Based on a short story by Ismat Chugtai, which she expanded into a film treatment. Filmfare Award for Best Screenplay (shared with Kaifi Azmi).

 Manthan (The Churning) 1976 / Colour / 134min / Hindi
Direction Shyam Benegal; Art direction Shama Zaidi

 Shatranj Ke Khilari शतरंज के  खिलाड़ी (Chess Players) 1977 / Hindi
Direction Satyajit Ray; Costume Design Shama Zaidi
Also assisted Ray with research on the background material and translated dialogues with Javed Siddiqi for the Indian characters in Urdu.

 Kanneshwara Rama (The Legendary Outlaw) 1977 / Colour / 137min / Kannada & Hindi
Direction M S Sathyu; Script Shama Zaidi
Based on the exploits of a legendary dacoit of the Malnad region in Karnataka.

 Bhumika (The Role) 1977 / Colour / 142min / Hindi
Direction Shyam Benegal; Art direction Shama Zaidi
Based on the biography of Hansa Wadkar, a star of the Marathi folk theatre and cinema of the 1940s.

 Umrao Jaan (The Courtesan) Colour / Hindi
Direction Muzaffar Ali; Script Shama Zaidi & Javed Siddiqi
Based on a 19th-century Urdu novel.

 Chakra (The Wheel) 1980 / Colour / 140min / Hindi
Direction Robin (Rabindra) Dharmraja; Script & Dialogues Shama Zaidi & Javed Siddiqi
Based on the novel by Jaywant Dalvi.

 Bara/Sookha (Famine) 1981 / Colour / 140min / Kannada & Hindi
Direction M S Sathyu; Screenplay & Dialogues Shama Zaidi & Javed Siddiqi
Based on a short novel by U R Ananthamurthy.

 Aarohan (The Ascent) 1982
Direction Shyam Benegal; Script Shama Zaidi
Based on a famous land dispute case.

 Mandi (The Marketplace) 1983 / Colour / 160min / Hindi
Direction Shyam Benegal; Script & Screenplay Shama Zaidi, Shyam Benegal & Satyadev Dubey

 Kahan Kahan Se Guzar Gaya (The Paths I Have Trod) 1985 / Colour / Hindi
Direction M S Sathyu; Original Screenplay Shama Zaidi

 Susman (The Essence) 1986 / Colour / 140min / Hindi
Direction Shyam Benegal; Screenplay Shama Zaidi
Original screenplay on the Ikat handloom weavers of Andhra.

 Trikaal (Past, Present, Future) 1986
Direction Shyam Benegal; Screenplay Shama Zaidi & Shyam Benegal
Based on an idea by Shyam Benegal.

 Antarnaad (The Inner Voice) 1993
Direction Shyam Benegal; Screenplay Shama Zaidi & Sunil Shanbag
An original screenplay based on the Swadhyaya socio-religious movement founded by Pandurang Shastri Athavale.

 Suraj Ka Satvan Ghoda (The Seventh Horse of the Sun) 1994
Direction Shyam Benegal; Screenplay Shama Zaidi
A puzzle screenplay based on the novel by Dharamvir Bharati.

 Mammo 1995
Direction Shyam Benegal; Screenplay Shama Zaidi & Khalid Mohamed

 The Making of the Mahatma 1996
Direction Shyam Benegal; Script Shama Zaidi, Shyam Benegal & Fatima Meer
An Indo-South African co production on Mahatma Gandhi's life in South Africa.

 Sardari Begum  1997 / Colour / 123min / Urdu
Direction Shyam Benegal; Screenplay Shama Zaidi & Khalid Mohamed

 Nishant
Art direction Shama Zaidi

 Mrigtrishna
Costume Design Shama Zaidi

 Haribhari 2000 / Colour / Hindi
Direction Shyam Benegal; Script & Dialogues Shama Zaidi
A film on women's empowerment made for the Ministry of Family Welfare.

 Zubeidaa 2001/ Colour / Hindi
Direction Shyam Benegal; Additional screenplay and dialogues Shama Zaidi

 Netaji Subhas Chandra Bose: The Forgotten Hero 2002-04/ Colour/Hindi-English
Direction Shyam Benegal; Script and Dialogues Shama Zaidi & Atul Tiwari
A film on the last years of Subhas Chandra Bose for Sahara Entertainment

 Chamki Chameli 2005-2006/ Colour/ Hindi
Direction Shyam Benegal; Screenplay and dialogues Shama Zaidi & Atul Tiwari
A film inspired by the 19th-century novella "Carmen" by Prosper Mérimée

 Mujib: The Making of a Nation 2019-22/ Colour/Bengali
Direction Shyam Benegal; Script and Dialogues Shama Zaidi & Atul Tiwari
A film on the life of Bangabandhu

Short films

References

External links
 
 Garam Hawa

1938 births
Living people
Indian Muslims
Indian women screenwriters
Indian art directors
Indian costume designers
20th-century Indian women artists
People from Rampur, Uttar Pradesh
Filmfare Awards winners
Delhi University alumni
Alumni of the Slade School of Fine Art
Indian People's Theatre Association people
Indian scenic designers
Women artists from Uttar Pradesh
Indian women journalists
Indian women designers
20th-century Indian designers
Hindi screenwriters
21st-century Indian designers
21st-century Indian women artists
Screenwriters from Uttar Pradesh
Women graphic designers
Twelvers
Indian Shia Muslims